Avoidant/restrictive food intake disorder (ARFID) is a type of eating disorder in which people eat only within an extremely narrow repertoire of foods. It is a serious mental health condition that causes the individual to restrict food intake by volume and/or variety. This avoidance may be based on appearance, smell, taste, texture (because of sensory sensitivity), brand, presentation, fear of adverse consequences, lack of interest in food, or a past negative experience with the food, to a point that may lead to nutritional deficiencies, failure to thrive, or other negative health outcomes. The fixation is not caused by a concern for body appearance or in an attempt to lose weight.

Signs and symptoms 
People with ARFID have an inability to eat certain foods. "Safe" foods may be limited to certain food types and even specific brands. In some cases, individuals with the condition will exclude whole food groups, such as fruit or vegetables. Sometimes excluded foods can be refused based on color. Some may only like very hot or very cold foods, very crunchy or hard-to-chew foods, or very soft foods, or avoid sauces.

Most people with ARFID will still maintain a healthy or typical body weight. There are no specific outward appearances associated with ARFID. People with the condition can experience physical gastrointestinal reactions to adverse foods such as retching, vomiting or gagging. Some studies have identified symptoms of social avoidance due to their eating habits. Most people with ARFID would change their eating habits if they could.

Associated conditions
The determination of the cause of ARFID has been difficult due to the lack of diagnostic criteria and concrete definition. However, many have proposed other conditions that co-occur with ARFID.

There are different kinds of 'sub-categories' identified for ARFID:
 Sensory-based avoidance, where the individual refuses food intake based on smell, texture, color, brand, presentation
 A lack of interest in consuming the food, or tolerating it nearby
 Food being associated with fear-evoking stimuli that have developed through a learned history

Autism 
Symptoms of ARFID are usually found with symptoms of other disorders or with neurodivergence. Some form of feeding disorder is found in 80% of children that also have a developmental disability. Children often exhibit symptoms of obsessive-compulsive disorder and autism. Although many people with ARFID have symptoms of these disorders, they usually do not qualify for a full diagnosis. Strict behavior patterns and difficulty adjusting to new things are common symptoms in patients that are on the autistic spectrum. A study done by Schreck at Pennsylvania State University compared the eating habits of children with autism spectrum disorder (ASD) and typically developing children. After analyzing their eating patterns, they suggested that the children with some degree of ASD have a higher degree of selective eating. These children were found to have patterns of selective eating, with foods eaten by more than 50% of the children indicating a clear preference for starches (such as crackers, potato chips, cake, cookies, spaghetti, and white bread). Children with ASD are less likely to outgrow selective eating behaviors, and consultation with a clinician is recommended to address their eating issues.

Anxiety disorder 
Specific food avoidances could be caused by food phobias that cause great anxiety when a person is presented with new or feared foods. Most eating disorders are related to a fear of gaining weight. Those who have ARFID do not have this fear, but the psychological symptoms and anxiety created are similar. Some people with ARFID have fears such as emetophobia (fear of vomiting) or a fear of choking.

Anorexia nervosa 
Though the physical symptoms may be similar, anorexia nervosa differs from ARFID because in ARFID the lack of food intake is not related to body image or weight concerns. Additionally, in a study analyzing the similarities between patients with AN and patients with ARFID, those with ARFID were significantly younger (10.8 vs 14.1 yrs old) with an earlier onset of illness (6.2 vs 13.7 yrs old) and a longer evolution time (61.2 vs 8.4 months). Also, a greater proportion of the ARFID patients were male rather than female (60.6% vs 6.1%). Additionally, when compared to patients diagnosed with anorexia nervosa or bulimia nervosa, patients with ARFID are more likely to be diagnosed with a co-occurring medical condition. Lastly, ARFID patients are more likely to have an anxiety disorder, but less likely to present with a mood disorder (e.g., bipolar, depression).

Epidemiology 
Unlike most eating disorders, there may be a higher rate of ARFID in young boys than there is in young girls. Presentations are often heterogenous. Additionally, literature suggests that parental pressure for a child to eat could potentially have a negative impact on the child's food intake. This is associated with picky eating and a decrease in weight during childhood. This can be contributing to the child's hunger cues, as well as, the child eating for reasons other than their hunger (e.g., emotions).

In a study conducted between 2008 and 2012, 22.5% of children aged 7–17 in day programs for eating disorder treatment were diagnosed with ARFID. In a 2021 study ARFID also has a high comorbidity with autism spectrum disorder (ASD), with up to 17% of adults with ASD at risk of developing disordered eating, with modest evidence for heritability. Among children, one study revealed a 12.5% prevalence of ASD among those diagnosed with ARFID. Other risk factors include sensory processing sensitivity, gastrointestinal disease and anxiety associated with eating. Prevalence among children aged 4–7 is estimated to be 1.3%, and 3.7% in females aged 8–18. The female cohort study also had a BMI of 7 lower points than the non-ARFID population.

Types of ARFID patients 

There are two types of ARFID patients identified: short-term and long-term patients. These are based on the amount of time an individual has had ARFID symptoms. Short-term patients have been recently diagnosed with ARFID. More recent onset can be associated with fear of choking or vomiting after experiencing or witnessing an event, and/or fear of gastrointestinal problems. Long-term patients are those who report with a long history of ARFID symptoms. Long-term ARFID patients include a history of selective or poor eating habits, a history of gastrointestinal problems, or generalized anxiety that impacted eating behaviors throughout childhood or for the past number of years.

Speculative causes 
Though the causes of ARFID are not well understood and rather speculative, there are some potential ones cited by both medical professionals and researchers:
 sensory sensitivity (sensitivity to tastes, textures and the appearance of foods)
 selective eating and fear of new foods
 fear of certain foods causing pain and discomfort
 fear of vomiting and/or gagging caused by new or "unsafe" foods
 low appetite or disinterest in food
 gastrointestinal problems when eating "unsafe" foods
 other unexplained fears surrounding "unsafe" foods and feeling poisoned
 autism spectrum disorder and anxiety disorders

Diagnosis 
Diagnosis is often based on a diagnostic checklist to test whether an individual is exhibiting certain behaviors and characteristics. Clinicians will look at the variety of foods an individual consumes, as well as the portion size of accepted foods. They will also question how long the avoidance or refusal of particular foods has lasted, and if there are any associated medical concerns, such as malnutrition.

Criteria 
The fifth edition of the Diagnostic and Statistical Manual of Mental Disorders (DSM-5) renamed "Feeding Disorder of Infancy or Early Childhood" to Avoidant/Restrictive Food Intake Disorder, and broadened the diagnostic criteria. Previously defined as a disorder exclusive to children and adolescents, the DSM-5 broadened the disorder to include adults who limit their eating and are affected by related physiological or psychological problems, but symptoms are distinct enough not to require a diagnosis of other specified feeding or eating disorder.

The DSM-5 defines the following diagnostic criteria:
 Disturbance in eating or feeding, as evidenced by one or more of:
 Substantial weight loss (or, in children, absence of expected weight gain)
 Nutritional deficiency
 Dependence on a feeding tube or dietary supplements
 Significant psychosocial interference
 Disturbance not due to unavailability of food, or to observation of cultural norms
 Disturbance not due to anorexia nervosa or bulimia nervosa, and no evidence of disturbance in experience of body shape or weight
 Disturbance not better explained by another medical condition or mental disorder, or when occurring concurrently with another condition, the disturbance exceeds what is normally caused by that condition
In previous years, the DSM was not inclusive in recognizing all of the challenges associated with feeding and eating disorders in 3 main domains:
 Eating Disorders Not Otherwise Specified (EDNOS) was an all-inclusive, placeholder group for all individuals that presented challenges with feeding
 The category of Feeding Disorder of Infancy/ Early Childhood was noted to be too broad, limiting specification when treating these behaviors
 There are children and youth who present feeding challenges but do not fit within any existing categories to date

Prevalence of ARFID compared to picky eating 
Children are often picky eaters, but this does not necessarily mean they meet the criteria for an ARFID diagnosis. ARFID is a rare condition, and though it shares many symptoms with regular picky eating, it is not diagnosed nearly as much. Picky eating, which can exhibit symptoms similar to those of ARFID, can be observed in 13–22% of children from ages 3–11, whereas the prevalence of ARFID has "ranged from 5% to 14% among pediatric inpatient ED [eating disorder] programs and as high as 22.5% in a pediatric ED day treatment program". There is potential for misdiagnosis given the similarity with picky eating and the prevalence of that condition, especially in cases where ARFID does not affect the person with the condition severely.

Differences from picky eating 
There are some key differences from picky eating that set ARFID apart.

First, ARFID is not a condition that is created by one's conscience, but a subconscious condition that prohibits the person with the condition from eating certain foods to the point where they will refuse to eat anything and starve themselves if not given options of what their subconscious has deemed "safe foods". What also makes ARFID special is that due to its subconscious nature, it cannot be combatted through bribery (e.g. offering a child something as a reward for eating an "unsafe" food), reason nor shouting and threatening. It is also believed that using those methods can lead to the condition or the anxieties associated with it worsening. When it comes to ARFID, eating or not eating certain foods is not a preference, but rather a necessity.

Second, ARFID can run deeper than just eating alone. It is documented that people with ARFID can have a particular anxiety towards trying new foods, but in some cases, that people with ARFID can also be scared of new experiences as a whole or novel situations where food is present. This, however, is a more rare complication and is not very widely documented. Given that some data suggests that ARFID may be associated with other psychological disorders, like anxiety disorders and autism spectrum disorders, and ADHD (Attention deficit hyperactivity disorder) these effects could be derived from those links.

Third, ARFID used to be associated with anorexia nervosa and bulimia nervosa due to its tendency to create issues with weight and nutrition, especially for children. While it is now known that cases of ARFID where there is more extreme weight loss or gain occur rather rarely, malnutrition is common, and any of these symptoms can set ARFID apart from the aforementioned conditions as well as picky eating.

Difficulties surrounding diagnosis 
As mentioned before, picky eating and ARFID share many symptoms, and the symptoms covered in the DSM-5 are broad, which can be both a detriment and an advantage: Stephanie G. Harshman of the neuroendocrine unit at Massachusetts General Hospital has been quoted saying: "The broad definitions used among DSM-5 criteria for [avoidant/restrictive food intake disorder (ARFID)] provide substantial flexibility in a clinical setting". It can be detrimental, as a broad scope can lead to false positive diagnoses of ARFID, though as an advantage it is better than the DSM-IV description which landed people with ARFID in the "EDNOS" (eating disorder not otherwise specified) category and made it more difficult for people with the condition to reach potential treatment.

A discriminating quality that was once considered to classify ARFID differently from picky eating was weight loss or gain, but given that this is not a universal feature of ARFID, that is no longer the case. Additionally, if weight loss or change (or more extreme malnutrition) are present, this can point towards the patient having anorexia nervosa or bulimia nervosa, and can also lead to a false negative diagnosis.

Due to the relative novelty of the DSM-5 and its new inclusion of ARFID, not everyone is familiar with the condition, making it more difficult to detect and diagnose. There is evidence that medical professionals who had diagnosed ARFID in a patient prior to meeting another patient with ARFID were more likely to detect and diagnose it than those who had not.

Treatment

For adults 
With time the symptoms of ARFID can lessen and can eventually disappear without treatment. However, in some cases treatment will be needed as the symptoms persist into adulthood. The most common type of treatment for ARFID is some form of cognitive-behavioral therapy. Working with a clinician can help to change behaviors more quickly than symptoms may typically disappear without treatment.

There are support groups for adults with ARFID.

For children 
Children can benefit from a four stage in-home treatment program based on the principles of systematic desensitization. The four stages of the treatment are record, reward, relax and review.
 In the 'record stage', children are encouraged to keep a log of their typical eating behaviors without attempting to change their habits as well as their cognitive feelings.
 The 'reward stage' involves systematic desensitization. Children create a list of foods that they might like to try eating some day. These foods may not be drastically different from their normal diet, but perhaps a familiar food prepared in a different way. Because the goal is for the children to try new foods, children are rewarded when they sample new foods.
 The 'relaxation stage' is most important for those children with severe anxiety when presented with unfavorable foods. Children learn to relax to reduce the anxiety that they feel. Children work through a list of anxiety-producing stimuli and can create a story line with relaxing imagery and scenarios. Often these stories can also include the introduction of new foods with the help of a real person or fantasy person. Children then listen to this story before eating new foods as a way to imagine themselves participating in an expanded variety of foods while relaxed.
 The final stage, 'review', is important to keep track of the child's progress, both in one-on-one sessions with the child, as well as with the parent in order to get a clear picture of how the child is progressing and if the relaxation techniques are working.

For both adults and children 
A suitable treatment for older children and adults alike is CBT-AR (Cognitive Behavioral Therapy for Avoidant/Restrictive Food Intake Disorder), in which around 90% of participants have found high levels of satisfaction with the programme. While the rate of remission to this type of programme is said to be around 40%, it has seen higher efficacy among children and young adults compared to adults, and greater family involvement has also been seen to help. The main goals of treatment for CBT-AR are to achieve or to maintain a health weight, treat nutritional deficits, consume items from all 5 of the basic dietary groups, and to be more comfortable in social settings and circumstances. CBT-AR workbook can be used as a resource for professionals. This workbooks includes psychoeducation about ARFID, self-monitoring records for food logs, and the different stages in treatment.

The treatment is broken up into 4 stages and aimed to help "reduce nutritional compromise and increase opportunities for exposure to novel foods to reduce negative feelings and predictions about eating". In a simplified format, the stages of this treatment are:

 Psychoeducation regarding ARFID and CBT-AR, setting up a regular pattern of eating and self-monitoring.
 Psychoeducation about nutrition deficiencies, selecting new foods to help aid the loss of those deficiencies.
 Figuring out the root cause(s) of the patient's ARFID (mentioned above in the Speculative causes section), bringing in 5 new foods to examine, describe their features and try tasting them throughout the week, lastly exposure to the foods in the sessions.
 Evaluating progress and compiling a relapse prevention plan.

This is set to take place over 20–30 sessions ranging from 6 months to a year.

Assessment 

The Nine Item Avoidant/Restrictive Food Intake Disorder Screen (NIAS)  can be a tool used by professionals to assess the presence of ARFID. This is a 9-item, 6-point Likert scale (e.g., strongly disagree to strongly agree) screener. The assessment has a total score of 0-45 points. An ARFID diagnosis is most likely if an individual scores are greater than 10 on the picky eating scale, greater than 9 on the appetite scale, and/or greater than 10 on the fear scale. This measure should be used in concordance with other measures to increase sensitivity (true positive) of the diagnosis.

Medical treatment 

Individuals with ARFID might need additional help outside of psychotherapy to increase their caloric intake and get to receive nutritional needs. Individuals with ARFID might take nutritional supplements. Patients may require nasogastric or gastrostomy tube feeding. Patients with ARFID are more likely than those diagnosed with another eating disorder to be initially evaluated in an outpatient setting while relying on long-term nasogastric or gastrostomy feedings. Patients with another eating disorder typically receive short-term nasogastric or gastrostomy feedings.

Prevention 
While there is no way to predict who will develop ARFID, there might be ways to help diminish the probability of developing the disorder. Pediatricians should take special care in recognizing a child's eating patterns and intake, specifically parental concerns. Particularly, many parents worry that their child is not consuming enough food daily. As a result, they frequently coerce or bribe the child into eating even though the child is of normal development. This could negatively impact the child's view on different foods and create backlash from the child to the parent. Also, it is important for the parent and child to establish appropriate feeding practices. The child's doctor can assist to establish the proper feeding tool to allow the child to develop normally and create a positive relationship towards food and eating. The parent is responsible for when, where, and what the food is, and the child is responsible for how much they eat.  It is important to keep meals consistent and set an example of proper dining etiquette and to not force the child to eat.

See also 
 Food neophobia
 Orthorexia nervosa

References

Further reading 

 Cognitive-Behavioral Therapy for Avoidant/Restrictive Food Intake Disorder: Children, Adolescents, and Adults

External links 

Eating disorders
Culture-bound syndromes